Ricky Womack (May 7, 1961 in Detroit, Michigan – January 19, 2002 at St. John Oakland Hospital, Madison Heights, Michigan) was a professional boxer from the United States. Known primarily for his amateur career, during which he already earned his nickname "Wonderful," coming to attention of Howard Cosell, who predicted his bright future as a most likely U.S. Olympic Team light heavyweight for the 1984 Olympics, and a successful professional career afterwards, but both predictions proved unfulfilled, as Womack lost the Olympic qualifiers to Evander Holyfield, and his up-and-coming professional career crumbled after a criminal conviction.

Early years
Womack had a physically abusive father, and neglecting mother. Eventually social services took Ricky along with his seven brothers and sisters away from his mother to a foster care. He started boxing at the age of thirteen with the Kronk Gym, being trained by Emanuel Steward. But troubled childhood deeply affected his personality, he became a staunch kleptomaniac and had frequent brushes with the law enforcement authorities. At that time his teammate, another Kronk's young talent Mark Breland came under Womack's destructive influence. Womack's criminal habits eventually led him to a long term prison sentence.

Amateur career
Womack had a remarkable amateur career, defeating future legend Evander Holyfield several times (one by walkover,) with two of the losses being avenged by Evander at the Olympic Box-offs, and cutting Ricky's way to the 1984 Summer Olympics.

Holyfield rivalry
Womack jumped into heavyweight already in 1982, winning the AAU Nationals, and proving he's comfortable in that weight class, but he soon came back into light heavyweight, reportedly to prove to his long-lasting nemesis, Holyfield, that he was the better man. As Holyfield later recalled:

Highlights

 Boxing at the Ohio State Fair (178 lbs), Columbus, Ohio, August 1982:
Finals: Defeated Jeff Goff by decision 
 United States National Championships (201 lbs), Indianapolis, Indiana, December 1982:
1/16: Defeated Bill Soaki RET 3 
1/8: Defeated Patrick Slade by unanimous decision, 5–0
1/4: Defeated Poncho Carter KO 1 
1/2: Defeated Terry Anderson by majority decision, 4–1 
Finals: Defeated Richard Johnson by unanimous decision, 5–0
USA–USSR Duals (178 lbs), Caesars Palace, Las Vegas, Nevada, February 1983:
Defeated Vitaliy Kachanovskiy (Soviet Union) RSC 1
 National Golden Gloves (178 lbs), Albuquerque, New Mexico, March 1983:
1/4: Defeated ? Larson
1/2: Defeated Sherman Griffin by decision
Finals: Defeated Johnny Williams by decision
AIBA International World Championships Challenge (178 lbs), Korakuen Hall, Tokyo, Japan, May 1983:
 Lost to Pablo Romero (Cuba) by majority decision, 1–4
 National Sports Festival (178 lbs), Colorado Springs, Colorado, June 1983:
1/2: Defeated Ronnie North by unanimous decision, 5–0
Finals (Pan Am Trials): Lost to Evander Holyfield by split decision, 2–3
Pan Am Box-Offs (178 lbs), St. Louis, Missouri, August 1983:
Finals: Lost to Evander Holyfield by decision
 North American Championships (178 lbs), Houston, Texas, September 1983:
1/2: Defeated Danny Lindstrom (Canada) DQ 2
Finals: Defeated Pablo Romero (Cuba) by majority decision, 4–1

 World Cup (178 lbs), Palazzo dello Sport, Rome, Italy, October 1983:
1/4: Defeated Lee Hoo Soo (South Korea) by unanimous decision, 5–0
1/2: Defeated Paweł Skrzecz (Poland) by walkover
Finals: Lost to Vitaliy Kachanovskiy (Soviet Union) by majority decision, 1–4
 United States National Championships (178 lbs), Colorado Springs, Colorado, November 1983:
1/8: Defeated Sherman Griffin KO 1 
1/4: Defeated David Lester KO 1
1/2: Defeated Evander Holyfield by walkover
Finals: Defeated Bennie Heard by unanimous decision, 5–0
USA–GDR Duals (178 lbs), Biloxi, Mississippi, November 1983:
Defeated Andreas Schroth (East Germany) by majority decision, 2–1
USA–Combined Team of GBR & Canada Duals (178 lbs), Reno, Nevada, November 1983:
Defeated Ken Johnson (Canada) KO 1 
AIBA International World Championships Challenge (178 lbs), Memorial Coliseum, Los Angeles, California, April 1984:
Defeated Pablo Romero (Cuba) RSC 1 
National Olympic Trials (178 lbs), Tarrant County Convention Center, Fort Worth, Texas, June 1984:
1/4: Defeated Orbit Pough RSC 2
1/2: Defeated Evander Holyfield by split decision, 3–2 
Finals: Defeated Bennie Heard by unanimous decision, 5–0
Olympic Box-offs (178 lbs), Caesars Palace, Las Vegas, Nevada, July 1984:
Day 1: Lost to Evander Holyfield by majority decision, 1–4
Day 2: Lost to Evander Holyfield by majority decision, 1–4 

Afterwards Womack signed a contract with the Kronk boxing team when he turned professional.

Womack finished his amateur career with an estimated record of 54 wins, 14 losses.

Professional career
Womack turned pro in 1984 and began his career with a promising string of victories, including a victory over future champion Uriah Grant, and was undefeated in his first nine bouts until troubles outside of the ring derailed his career.

Troubles outside the ring
Womack was sentenced to 25 years for armed robbery. After serving 15 years, Womack was released in November 2000.

Comeback
After his release, Womack returned to the ring in 2001 and won all four bouts.

Professional boxing record

|-
| style="text-align:center;" colspan="8"|13 Wins (6 knockouts, 7 decisions), 0 Losses, 1 Draw 
|-  style="text-align:center; background:#e3e3e3;"
|  style="border-style:none none solid solid; "|Result
|  style="border-style:none none solid solid; "|OppRecord
|  style="border-style:none none solid solid; "|Opponent
|  style="border-style:none none solid solid; "|Type
|  style="border-style:none none solid solid; "|Round
|  style="border-style:none none solid solid; "|Date
|  style="border-style:none none solid solid; "|Location
|  style="border-style:none none solid solid; "|Notes
|-
|Win
|
|align=left| Willie "Wreckless" Chapman
|UD
|6
|23 Nov 2001
|align=left| The Palace, Auburn Hills, Michigan, United States
|align=left|
|-
|Win
|
|align=left| Kenny Show
|UD
|4
|24 Jul 2001
|align=left| Chene Park, Detroit, Michigan, United States
|align=left|
|-
|Win
|
|align=left| Gesses Mesgana
|TKO
|4
|11 May 2001
|align=left| Gray's Armory, Cleveland, Ohio, United States
|align=left|
|-
|Win
|
|align=left| Curt "Professor" Paige
|TKO
|3
|29 Mar 2001
|align=left| Cobo Hall, Detroit, Michigan, United States
|align=left|
|-align=center
|colspan=8 style=background:lavender|
|-
|Win
|
|align=left| John "Governor" Smith
|TKO
|2
|3 Dec 1985
|align=left| Showboat Hotel and Casino, Las Vegas, Nevada, United States
|align=left|
|-
|Win
|
|align=left| Uriah Grant
|PTS
|6
|17 Oct 1985
|align=left| Star Plaza Theatre, Merrillville, Indiana, United States
|align=left|
|-
|Win
|
|align=left| Billy "The Kid" Saunders
|TKO
|3
|30 Aug 1985
|align=left| Trump Plaza Hotel and Casino, Atlantic City, New Jersey, United States
|align=left|
|-
|Win
|
|align=left| Dawud Shaw
|UD
|6
|1 Aug 1985
|align=left| Atlantic City, New Jersey, United States
|align=left|
|-
|Win
|
|align=left| Bob "Lightning" Smith
|UD
|6
|30 Jun 1985
|align=left| Tropicana Las Vegas, Las Vegas, Nevada, United States
|align=left|
|-
|Win
|
|align=left| David Vedder
|UD
|6
|15 Apr 1985
|align=left| Caesars Palace, Las Vegas, Nevada, United States
|align=left|
|-
|Win
|
|align=left| Victor Felder
|KO
|2
|31 Jan 1985
|align=left| Atlantic City, New Jersey, United States
|align=left|
|-
|Win
|
|align=left| Jerry Parker
|UD
|4
|19 Oct 1984
|align=left| Madison Square Garden, New York City, United States
|align=left|
|-
|Win
|
|align=left| Bill Hollis
|TKO
|1
|15 Sep 1984
|align=left| Saginaw Civic Center, Saginaw, Michigan, United States
|align=left|
|-
|Draw
|
|align=left| Sonny Jones
|PTS
|4
|26 Jul 1984
|align=left| Miami Beach Convention Center, Miami Beach, Florida, United States
|align=left|
|}

Death
On January 19, 2002, Womack committed suicide, two months after his last fight.

References

External links 
 (history)

Boxers from Detroit
Heavyweight boxers
Winners of the United States Championship for amateur boxers
National Golden Gloves champions
1961 births
2002 suicides
American male boxers
American people convicted of robbery
American sportspeople convicted of crimes